Marcel Henri Joseph de Wolf (19 September 1919 – 30 March 1999) was a French gymnast. He competed at the 1948 Summer Olympics and the 1952 Summer Olympics.

References

1919 births
1999 deaths
French male artistic gymnasts
Olympic gymnasts of France
Gymnasts at the 1948 Summer Olympics
Gymnasts at the 1952 Summer Olympics
20th-century French people